The Retention Excellence Award (previously known as the Golden Anchor Award) is an award given by the United States Department of the Navy for sustaining superior levels of military retention. The award was established by the United States Fleet Forces Command through the Fleet Retention Excellence Program.  Deployable Navy ships are authorized to paint their anchors gold as a symbol of earning the award.

References

Awards and decorations of the United States Navy